Genki Rockets II: No Border Between Us is the second full-length album from virtual band Genki Rockets. The album was released on September 7, 2011, roughly 3 years and two months after their first eponymous debut Genki Rockets I: Heavenly Star. The album comprises around twenty tracks which remain in the same J-pop and electronica genre as the first album. To accompany the first single Make.Believe the band made a 3D video which has been shown in Expo's in Tokyo and Los Angeles. Followed by another 3D video, published in June 2010: Curiosity. Instead the third music video Touch me was released with the CD in 2D. The cover art depicts fictional lead singer Lumi floating on an unknown planet while the earth revolves in the background which is also a screenshot from the make.believe video. The first 13 tracks are original while tracks 14-17 are bonus tracks which are remixes.

Track listing

References

2011 albums